The 2012–13 FC Krasnodar season was the club's 2nd successive season in the Russian Premier League, the highest tier of association football in Russia, in which they finished in 10th place. They also took part in the 2012–13 Russian Cup, getting eliminated at the last 16 stage by rivals Kuban Krasnodar.

Squad

Out on loan

Reserve squad
The following players were registered with the RFPL and were listed by club's website as reserve players. They are eligible to play for the first team.

Transfers

Summer

In:

Out:

Winter

In:

Out:

Competitions

Overview

Premier League

League table

Results summary

Results by round

Results

Russian Cup

Squad statistics

Appearances and goals

|-
|colspan="14"|Players who left Krasnodar on loan during the season:

|-
|colspan="14"|Players who appeared for Krasnodar who left during the season:

|}

Goal scorers

Clean sheets

Disciplinary record

Notes

References

FC Krasnodar seasons
FC Krasnodar